The Frontenac County Court House in Kingston, Ontario, Canada is the Courthouse for Frontenac County, Ontario.  The Neoclassical building was designed by Edward Horsey and constructed by builders Scobell and Tossell. Alternation after 1874 fire by John Power added the dome tower. It overlooks City Park to its south, and Lake Ontario beyond. The front of the structure features the Royal coat of arms of the United Kingdom.

The building is made from limestone.

The building is located north of Court Street, between Barrie Street and West Street, directly north-east from Queen's Campus. To its north is located Sydenham Public School, and to its south (south of Court Street) is a park with sports fields directly east of Queen's.

History 

The courthouse opened in 1858. Its domed roof tower was added in 1874 after a fire and a three-tiered fountain was added in 1903.

In 1980 it was designated a National Historic Site of Canada.

In October 2011, the Shafia family murders trial began to be heard at this courthouse. The largest courtroom in the courthouse was rewired to add flat-screen televisions and two soundproof booths for real-time translation by interpreters via headphones.

Interior

Pre-1963 changes the Court House was home to Court of Queen's Bench and county administrative offices from 1865-1998:

2nd floor
 Judge's room
 Council Chambers
 Jury Room
 Court Room
 Barristers room
 Library
 Rest room

Main

 offices of the county sheriff, county clerk
 judge's office
 judges chambers
 Court room B, C and D
 treasurer's office
 public offices

Since 1963 many rooms have been altered, including loss of one court room on the second floor.

See also
 Kingston City Hall (Ontario)

References

 History at waymarking.com
 History at realontario.ca
 Frontenac County Court House National Historic Site

External links
 High resolution (1.7Gpx) exterior photo
 360-degree panorama

1858 establishments in Canada
1858 architecture
Courthouses in Canada
National Historic Sites in Ontario
Buildings and structures in Kingston, Ontario
Neoclassical architecture in Canada
Designated heritage properties in Ontario